Pherbina is a genus of flies in the family Sciomyzidae, the marsh flies or snail-killing flies.

Species
P. coryleti (Scopoli, 1763)
P. intermedia Verbeke, 1948
P. mediterranea Mayer, 1953
P. testacea (Sack, 1939)

References

Sciomyzidae
Sciomyzoidea genera